The Boob (released in the UK as The Yokel) is a 1926 American silent romantic comedy film directed by William A. Wellman, and starring Gertrude Olmstead, Antonio D'Algy, George K. Arthur, and Joan Crawford as a law enforcement agent.

Plot
Peter (George K. Arthur), a courteous idealist, seeks to win the heart of Amy (Gertrude Olmstead), who in turn fancies urbane Harry (Tony D'Algy). Jane (Joan Crawford) is a Prohibition agent who helps uncover bootlegging activities.

Cast
 Gertrude Olmstead as Amy 
 George K. Arthur as Peter Good
 Joan Crawford as Jane
 Charles Murray as Cactus Jim
 Tony D'Algy as Harry Benson (credited as Antonio D'Algy) 
 Hank Mann as The Village Soda Clerk
 Edythe Chapman as The Old Lady (uncredited)
 Babe London as Fat Girl (uncredited)

Preservation
A print of The Boob has been prepared and preserved by MGM.

References

External links
 
 
 
 

1926 films
1926 romantic comedy films
American romantic comedy films
Metro-Goldwyn-Mayer films
American silent feature films
American black-and-white films
Films directed by William A. Wellman
1920s American films
Silent romantic comedy films
Silent American comedy films